The discography of an Australian electropunk group Rogue Traders consists of four studio albums, one compilation album, and seventeen singles under Vicious Grooves and Sony BMG. Rogue Traders were formed in Melbourne, Australia in 2000 by DJs James Ash and Steve Davis. Their debut album We Know What You're Up To was released in May 2003, over a full year after the release of the original lead single "Need You to Show Me", which failed to chart and was not included on the released album. The following single, "Give in to Me" also failed to gain success, peaking at #67 on the ARIA Singles Chart, however the next single, "One of My Kind", a remix of "Need You Tonight" by INXS scored the band-then-duo their first top ten position, peaking at #10 on the ARIA Singles Chart, and won the award for "Best Dance Track" at the 2003 ARIA Music Awards. The following single, "Stay?", failed to reach the success of its preceding single, as did the album, We Know What You're Up To, peaking at #60 and failing to chart, respectively.

After a significant line-up change, the band released the single "Voodoo Child" with new lead singer Natalie Bassingthwaighte. The song proved to be their best-selling single to date, reaching #4 on the ARIA Singles Chart and was accredited Platinum in Australia for shipments of 70,000. "Voodoo Child" was later released internationally throughout 2006 and 2007, however it failed to reach to reach the same success as in the band's native Australia, except in the UK, where it peaked at #3 and was certified Silver for shipments of 200,000 by the British Phonographic Industry. The song was also notably featured in a 2007 episode of Doctor Who, "The Sound of Drums". The single was taken off the band's second studio album, Here Come the Drums, which was released in October 2005 in Australia, where it was a large commercial success, peaking at #2 and was certified 4× Platinum for shipments of 280,000. The album remained in the Top 50 Albums Chart for seventy-four weeks throughout 2005, 2006, and 2007, and was nominated for four ARIA Music Awards. "Way to Go!" was released as the album's second single in Australia, where it peaked at #7 and was certified Gold, whilst "Watching You" was released as the second single in UK, where in comparison to "Voodoo Child" it was a commercial disappointment, peaking at #33. It fared better in Australia, where it was released as the album's third single, and peaked at #5 and was certified Gold. "Way to Go!" was slightly remixed for its release in the UK as the album's third single, however it failed to appear on the Top 200. "We're Coming Home" was released as the album's fourth and final single exclusively in Australia, where it peaked at #14. "In Love Again" was released exclusively to radio as a promotional single in late 2006.

The band released their third studio album, Better in the Dark, in Australia in October 2007 to moderate commercial success, peaking at #4 and was certified Platinum. The album was preceded by the single "Don't You Wanna Feel", which debuted and peaked at #10 and was certified Gold. The following single, "I Never Liked You", peaked at #9 and was also certified Gold, whilst the album's third and final single, "What You're On", peaked at #30. Following this, Bassingthwaighte left the band. After a brief hiatus through 2008 and 2009, the band revealed their new lead singer, Melinda "Mindi" Jackson, and released their first single with her, "Love Is a War", in December 2009 from their fourth studio album, Night of the Living Drums. However, "Love Is a War" and the following single, "Would You Raise Your Hands?", were both commercial disappointments, peaking at #90 and #95 respectively, and also were received negatively by the general public and by music critics. The single "Hearts Beat as One" was released as the official anthem for the Socceroos for the 2010 FIFA World Cup. It failed to chart, their first single to do so since 2002, and subsequently, the album Night of the Living Drums, which had been scheduled for release in June 2010, was delayed indefinitely, and Rogue Traders were dropped from Sony Records. Shortly after this, the band split. Their fourth studio album and greatest hits compilation, The Sound of Drums, was released in November 2011 for the band's tenth anniversary.

Albums

Studio albums

Compilation albums

Singles

Notes

Music videos

Remixes
These songs have been remixed by Rogue Traders.

References

External links

Rogue Traders
Discographies of Australian artists
Pop music group discographies